Apadanda T. Raghu popularly known as "A.T.Raghu" is an Indian director, actor, producer and screenplay writer, who has worked in the Kannada, Hindi, Malayalam and Kodava Takk film industries.

Personal life
He was born in Kodagu to the Kodava community.

Career
Raghu entered the cinema industry under the guidance of director and producer B. Vittalacharya. Then later he became an assistant for director Y. R. Swamy. In 1980 he independently directed Nyaya Neethi Dharma, a Kannada movie starring Ambareesh, Aarathi, Dwarakish, Sundar Krishna Urs, Jai Jagadish and K S Ashwath, produced by V K Ramesh. Ever since Raghu has directed at least 55 movies.

He made a Hindi film Meri Adalat in 1984 starring Rajnikanth. The following year he made a Malayalam movie Kattu Rani (see Malayalam films of 1985). In 1990 he made a Kannada movie Ajay-Vijay (see Kannada films of 1990) starring Jaggesh, Murali and Raghuveer in his debut role as actor. In 1994, Raghu made the Kannada movie Mandyada Gandu starring Ambareesh, Vajramuni and Bank Janardhan. This movie had the popular song 'Mandyada Gandhu' composed by Upendra Kumar.

He has directed and acted in at least least 55 movies out of which 23 movies starring Ambareesh (see Ambareesh filmography). Some of them are Aasha (1983), Avala Neralu (1983), Goonda Guru (1985), Antima Teerpu (1988), Mysore Jaana (1992) and Midida Hrudayagalu (1993). 

He has directed *1 documentary movie* for the *government of Karnataka*. Raghu worked as a coordinator with R N Jayagopal for the *Ramayana* telecast in the *Kannada Language*.
To showcase the Kodava talent to the outside world and to provide a platform for Kodava artists, Raghu directed and produced *6 very popular Kodava Tele-serials Ainmane, Pombolcha, Thamane, Gejje Thand, Jamma Bhoomi & Nanga Kodava* telecast by Bangalore Doordarshan in Chandana channel for over a period of 20 years*.
For the great works that Raghu achieved in his life, the *government of Karnataka* honored Raghu with *Puttanna Kanagal Award* in the year 2004-2005 and *Kannada Rajyotsava Award* in 2020. He is also a recipient of the *Karnataka Film Fans Association Award, Kodava Sahitya Academy Award, Kalasagara Sangeetha Nrithya Nataka Academy Award, KANFIDA Award, RNR Award, Bangalore Doordarshan Chandana Award for cinema, Bangalore Kodava Samaja Centenary Celebration Award* to name a few.

Filmography

Jenifer I Love You (2004)
Rambo Raja Revolver Rani
Betegaara
Shravana Sanje
Mandyada Gandu (1994)
Jailer Jagannath
Midida Hrudayagalu (1993)
Suryodaya
Mysore Jaana
Putta Hendthi (1992)
Kempu Surya
Ajay Vijay
Nyayakkagi Naanu
Padma Vyuha
Krishna Mecchida Radhe
Aapadbandava
Inspector Kranti Kumar
Antima Teerpu (1988)
Preethi (1986)
Kattu Rani (1985) (Malayalam)
Devara Mane (1985)
Kadina Raja
Guru Jagadguru
Gundaguru
Meri Adalat (1984) (Hindi)
Darmayudda
Avala Neralu (1983)
Aasha (1983)
Shankar-Sundar
Nyaya Neeti Dharma (1980)

See also
Meri Adalat

References

Kannada film directors
People from Kodagu district
Hindi-language film directors
Kodava Takk
Living people
Kodava people
Malayalam film directors
20th-century Indian film directors
21st-century Indian film directors
Film directors from Karnataka
Male actors from Karnataka
Year of birth missing (living people)